Eucalyptus sporadica, commonly known as the Burngup mallee, is a species of mallee that is endemic to the southwest of Western Australia. It has smooth bark, lance-shaped adult leaves, flower buds in groups of seven, yellowish flowers and down-turned, conical to cylindrical fruit.

Description
It has smooth, red-brown, grey, greenish grey or silvery white bark, occasionally with a short stocking of rough bark. Flowering occurs from March or June to October or December and the flowers are lemon to greenish yellow.

Taxonomy and naming
Eucalyptus sporadica was first formally described in 2002 by Ian Brooker and Stephen Hopper in the journal Nuytsia from specimens collected by Brooker near Burngup, south-east of Pingaring in 1984. The specific epithet (sporadica) is from the Latin word sporadicus meaning "sporadic", referring to the widespread but scattered distribution of the species.

Distribution and habitat
Burngup mallee grows on sand, loam, clay soils and gravel and is found on granite outcrops, lateritic hills and breakaways. It is found between Peak Charles, Tarin Rock and the Fitzgerald River National Park in the Avon Wheatbelt, Coolgardie, Esperance Plains, Mallee and Murchison biogeographic regions.

Conservation status
This mallee is classified as "not threatened" by the Western Australian Government Department of Parks and Wildlife.

See also
List of Eucalyptus species

References

Eucalypts of Western Australia
Endemic flora of Western Australia
sporadica
Myrtales of Australia
Plants described in 2002
Taxa named by Ian Brooker
Taxa named by Stephen Hopper